Nathaniel Rothschild may refer to:

 Nathan Mayer Rothschild (1777–1836), British banker
 Nathaniel de Rothschild (1812–1870), banker and vintner, Château Mouton Rothschild
 Nathaniel Meyer von Rothschild (1836–1905),  member of the Rothschild banking family of Austria
 Nathan Rothschild, 1st Baron Rothschild (1840–1915), British banker and politician
 Nathaniel Charles Rothschild (1877–1923), British banker and entomologist 
 Nathaniel Charles Jacob Rothschild, 4th Baron Rothschild (b. 1936), British investment banker
 Nathaniel Philip Rothschild (born 1971), British investor, former co-chairman of Atticus Capital